Paharia may refer to:
 Paharia language (disambiguation)
 Mal Paharia people
 Sauria Paharia people (also called Maler Paharia) 
 Paharia Express
 Paharia (cicada), a genus of cicadas